Cornuticlava is a genus of moths belonging to the subfamily Tortricinae of the family Tortricidae.

Species
Cornuticlava aritrana Common, 1965
Cornuticlava beccarii (Diakonoff, 1960)
Cornuticlava binaiae Razowski, 2013
Cornuticlava chrysoconis (Diakonoff, 1954)
Cornuticlava cuspidata (Diakonoff, 1954)
Cornuticlava heijningeni Diakonoff, 1972
Cornuticlava kobipoto Razowski, 2013
Cornuticlava phanera Common, 1965
Cornuticlava saliaris (Meyrick, 1928)
Cornuticlava spectralis (Meyrick, 1912)

See also
List of Tortricidae genera

References

External links
tortricidae.com

Schoenotenini
Moth genera